Phillip Lee (born 12 February 1977 in Brisbane, Queensland) is an Australian former professional rugby league footballer who played in the 1990s and 2000s. He played for the South Queensland Crushers and the Brisbane Broncos, usually in the forwards.

Brisbane won the 2000 NRL Grand Final but Lee did not play.

References

External links
Rugby League in New Zealand

1977 births
Australian rugby league players
Brisbane Broncos players
South Queensland Crushers players
Rugby league hookers
Rugby league locks
Sportsmen from Queensland
Rugby league players from Brisbane
Living people